Jürgen Rooste (born in 1979 in Tallinn) is an Estonian poet.

He has been graduated from Tallinn Pedagogical University in Estonian language speciality.

Awards:
 1999: Betti Alver Award

Works

 1999: poetry collection Sonetid ('Sonnets')
 2000: poetry collection Veri valla
 2002: poetry collection Lameda taeva all 
 2003: poetry collection Rõõm ühest koledast päevast

References

Living people
1979 births
Estonian male poets
20th-century Estonian poets
21st-century Estonian poets
Tallinn University alumni
Writers from Tallinn